Aeroflot Flight 101 may refer to two aviation accidents:
 Aeroflot Flight 20/101, also called Aeroflot Flight 20, Ilyushin Il-18 crash in 1965
 Aeroflot Flight 101/435, also called Aeroflot Flight 435, Antonov An-24 hijacking incident in 1985

Flight number disambiguation pages